is a Japanese voice actor from Miyagi Prefecture, best known for playing Magna Swing in Black Clover.

Filmography

Television animation
Inazuma Eleven GO (2011) – Hayabusa Hideki
Log Horizon (2013) – (Taro)
Dragonar Academy (2014) – Maximillian Russell
Re:Zero − Starting Life in Another World (2016) – Rachins
Black Clover (2017) – Magna Swing, Baro
Nana Maru San Batsu (2017) – Nakazawa Touichirou
Ninja Girl & Samurai Master 3rd Season (2018) – Nagayoshi Mori
Dr. Stone (2019) – Ganen
Kono Oto Tomare! (2019) – Matsunaga
Beastars (2019) – Dom

Original video animation
Code Geass: Akito the Exiled (2013) – Alan Necker

Video games
Black Clover: Quartet Knights (2018) – Magna Swing

Dubbing

Live-action
 Smash (2012) – (Ellis Boyd) (Jaime Cepero)
 The Babysitter  (2017) – (Cole Johnson) (Judah Lewis)
 Best.Worst.Weekend.Ever. (2018) – (Zedd)

Animation
 Curious George – (Juicy J)
 Doc McStuffins – (Orville)

References

External links
 Official profile
 

1989 births
Living people
Japanese male voice actors
Male voice actors from Miyagi Prefecture